Lilian Mercedes Letona (September 24, 1954 – August 1, 1983), was a Salvadoran guerrilla and communist revolutionary, member of the Farabundo Martí National Liberation Front (FMLN). Also known with her "nom de guerre" Comandante Clelia (Commander Clelia), she took part in the Salvadoran Civil War.

Biography
Born in 1954 in Turín, a town located in the Ahuachapán Department, she was the daughter of a school teacher and a small tradeswoman. Graduated in 1972 in painting, she was member of a student movement before to join the Ejército Revolucionario del Pueblo (ERP - People's Revolutionary Army), while promoting the incorporation of her sister Mercedes del Carmen Letona (nom de guerre Comandante Luisa) who later became a responsible of Radio Venceremos.

Since 1973, Clelia incorporated many workers of the factory "Cinturón Obrero" of San Salvador, in the secret worker unit of the ERP. She joined the urban guerrilla and took part in armed actions and revolutionary propaganda. In January 1974, aged 19, she went underground to avoid persecutions and joined the armed struggle, where she partecipe to the construction of the Partido de la Revolución Salvadoreña (PRS-ERP - Salvadoran Revolution Party, one of the founding subjects of the FMLN) becoming a member of its central committee in 1977. As member of it, she was responsible for the party and participated in the preparation of the general offensive of 1981 around the city of San Salvador, when she was captured of February 11.

For 22 days Clelia stayed on condition of desaparecida in a clandestine prison of the Policía Nacional (National Police), wheres she was found by the International Red Cross and transferred to the women's prison of Ilopango. She was released in June 1983 by an amnesty decreed by the government of Álvaro Magaña. After it, she joined the north-eastern military front Francisco Sánchez of the FMLN. Two months later she died in battle.

Media
A 1985 song of the Salvadoran singer Eduardo Cutumay Camones was named Comandante Clelia. The song is part of the album Por Eso Luchamos
The 1984 documentary film Commander Clelia: Political Prisoner is based on the interviews of 5 women, included Lilian Letona, imprisoned in the Salvadoran women's prison of Ilopango
In a 1992 song of the Italian group Banda Bassotti, named Figli della stessa rabbia, the Commander Clelia was cited with other revolutionary marxists. The song is part of the homonym album

See also
Mélida Anaya Montes ("Ana María")
Salvadoran Civil War
Frente Farabundo Martí para la Liberación Nacional

References

External links

  History of the ERP at CEDEMA website

1954 births
1983 deaths
People from Ahuachapán Department
Farabundo Martí National Liberation Front politicians
20th-century Salvadoran women politicians
20th-century Salvadoran politicians
Salvadoran guerrillas 
Salvadoran revolutionaries
Salvadoran communists
Women in war in Central America
Women in warfare post-1945
People of the Salvadoran Civil War
Deaths by firearm in El Salvador
Guerrillas killed in action